The Pontiac Torrent is a mid-size crossover SUV produced by General Motors for the 2006 to 2009 model years. A replacement for the Aztek, it was a mildly restyled version of the first-generation Chevrolet Equinox. The Torrent shared its basic body structure and mechanicals with the Equinox. However, the Torrent has a different front and rear end to distinguish it visually from the Equinox. The suspension was also modified to be firmer and sportier, and the electronic power steering was recalibrated to deliver a firmer, less artificial feel.

Design

The Torrent shared the Equinox's  3.4 L V6 with the 5-Speed Aisin AF33 automatic transmission.

Like other Pontiac models in the lineup, trim levels of the Torrent were entry-level Base, mid-level GT, and performance-oriented GXP. The GXP featured a more powerful 3.6-liter DOHC SFI V6 engine and a six-speed automatic transmission, along with a unique body kit and other exterior styling cues.

GXP

The GXP trim came with a new 6 speed automatic transmission (with Manual Tap Up/Down shifting capability) paired to a 3.6 L DOHC SFI V6 with  engine, (with a reported 0-60 mph time of 6.9 seconds). Other features include: 18 inch 5-spoke chrome wheels, twin hood scoops, and a unique front and rear body kit. The GXP Torrent sits  lower to the ground and has  of ground clearance. The lower stance is accented by the 18 inch wheels and the absent roof rack, giving the Torrent a smoother design flow compared to the standard Torrent. The GXP model also features a performance-tuned suspension, hydraulic power-assisted steering (as opposed to the electric power-assisted standard Torrent), improved interior trim (featuring piano black and chrome trim on the console and dash gauges), dual chrome-tipped exhaust, and GXP specific gauges and console trim. A navigation system is an option along with heated sport leather seats, DVD entertainment system, and Sunroof. The GXP became available for sale in the fall of 2007 as a 2008 model.

General Motors has repeatedly advertised the Torrent GXP on TV commercials claiming that the Torrent GXP had more of a horsepower advantage than the BMW X3 in an effort for GM to make Pontiac a low-cost rival to BMW.

Podium Edition

For the 2008 model year, the Torrent got the Podium Edition trim for the Vancouver 2010 Winter Olympic Games. The Torrent Podium Edition was only sold in Canada.

Discontinuation
The Pontiac Torrent was discontinued after the 2009 model year. The last Torrent rolled off the assembly line on September 2, 2009 as a result of General Motors discontinuing the Pontiac division in 2010. Originally, a new Buick SUV built on the GM Theta platform was going to be introduced in 2010 to serve as a replacement for the Torrent, but General Motors decided to replace the Torrent with a new GMC SUV built on the GM Theta platform called the GMC Terrain, which went on sale in 2009 for the 2010 model year.

Engines

Sales

References

External links

Official American website
Official Canadian website
Torrent and other GM crossovers fan site

All-wheel-drive vehicles
Cars introduced in 2005
Crossover sport utility vehicles
Front-wheel-drive vehicles
Torrent